Lucian John Hudson (born 5 July 1960 in London to Polish parents, Jan and Wanda Maria Pikulski) is a strategy and communications specialist from the UK. In 2020 he was appointed Director of Advancement, Marketing and Communications at Durham University, having served as Interim Director of Public Affairs and Communications at the University of Oxford, and Communications Director of The Open University.With effect from January 2023, he is also Professor in Practice (Leadership and Organisations) in the Department of Management and Marketing at Durham University Business School.  He is board chair and trustee of Earthwatch Europe, Chair of Tavistock Institute of Human Relations as well as a vice-president of the Liberal Judaism in the United Kingdom. 

Hudson has a degree in philosophy, politics and economics from St Catherine's College, Oxford. He was director of communications in three UK government departments, including the Foreign and Commonwealth Office, as well as the UK government's first "webmaster general". He was also an executive producer and television journalist for 17 years with the BBC and ITV. In 2013 Hudson served as an independent expert reviewing the communications capability of the Cabinet Office and No. 10 Downing Street.

References

1960 births
Living people
Alumni of St Catherine's College, Oxford
BBC newsreaders and journalists
British Jews
British people of Polish descent
Liberal Judaism (United Kingdom)